Mielecki (plural: Mieleccy, feminine form: Mielecka) was a family of knights, a branch of the Gryffin Clan. The founders and former owners of the City of Mielec.

History

It is believed that their progenitor could be Pawlik z Mielec, mentioned in 1224. The first documented ancestor was Jakub Trestka, castellan of Brzesc in 1334. The Mielecki of Gryf family line died out in 1771.

Notable members
 Stanislaw z Mielca, Royal Rotmistrz, castellan of Połaniec, married Elżbieta Tęczyńska h. Topór
 Jan Mielecki, Grand Marshal of the Crown, married Anna Koła h. Junosza
 Mikołaj Mielecki, Voivode of Podole and Grand Hetman of the Crown, married Elżbieta Radziwiłł h. Trąby
 Zofia Mielecka, married Prince Szymon Olelkowicz Słucki h. Pogoń Litewska and Hetman Jan Karol Chodkiewicz h. Kościesza

Coat of arms
The family used the Gryf coat of arms.

Bibliography
 Rodzina, herbarz szlachty polskiej, t. XI, Warszawa 1914

References